Fedde is both a surname and a given name. Notable people with the name include:

Surname
 Elizabeth Fedde (1850–1921), Norwegian Lutheran deaconess and founder of the Norwegian Relief Society
 Erick Fedde (born 1993), American Major League Baseball pitcher
 Friedrich Karl Georg Fedde (1873–1942), German botanist
 Samuel Simonsen Fedde (1769–1856), Norwegian politician

Given name
 Fedde Le Grand (born 1977), Dutch music producer and DJ
 Fedde Schurer (1898–1968), Dutch poet (in the West Frisian language), schoolteacher, journalist, language activist, politician

See also
 Fede, another surname and given name